HMAS Fremantle (J246/M246), named for the port city of Fremantle, Western Australia, was one of 60 Bathurst-class corvettes constructed during World War II, and one of 36 initially manned and commissioned solely by the Royal Australian Navy (RAN).

Design and construction

In 1938, the Australian Commonwealth Naval Board (ACNB) identified the need for a general purpose 'local defence vessel' capable of both anti-submarine and mine-warfare duties, while easy to construct and operate. Construction of the prototype  did not go ahead, but the plans were retained. The need for locally built 'all-rounder' vessels at the start of World War II saw the "Australian Minesweepers" (designated as such to hide their anti-submarine capability, but popularly referred to as "corvettes") approved in September 1939, with 60 constructed during the course of the war: 36 (including Fremantle) ordered by the RAN, 20 ordered by the British Admiralty but manned and commissioned as RAN vessels, and 4 for the Royal Indian Navy.

Fremantle was laid down by Evans Deakin & Co at Brisbane, Queensland. She was launched on 18 August 1942 by the wife of Prime Minister John Curtin, and commissioned into the RAN on 24 March 1943.

Operational history

World War II
When Fremantle entered active service in April 1943, she was immediately assigned to convoy escort duties along the east coast of Australia. This continued until August 1943, when the corvette was assigned as a convoy escort between Darwin and Thursday Island. She continued this duty until June 1945, when she was ordered to New Guinea waters to act as a guard ship. Fremantle remained in New Guinea waters until the end of World War II. The ship received two battle honours for her wartime service; "Darwin 1943" and "Pacific 1943–45".

Following the war's end, Fremantle was sent to Hong Kong, where she joined the 21st Minesweeping Flotilla in August 1945 and was involved in mine clearance in Chinese waters. On completion, the corvette returned to Australia, visiting her namesake city for the first time on 18 November 1945, before arriving in Melbourne and paying off into reserve on 25 January 1946.

Post-war
Fremantle was recommissioned on 10 December 1952 as a training ship for National Service trainees. Based in the port of Fremantle, the corvette was also involved in fisheries protection, monitoring of the Japanese pearling fleet, and hydrographic surveys.

Decommissioning and fate
Fremantle paid off to reserve for the second time on 22 June 1959. She was sold for scrapping to Kinoshita (Australia) Pty Ltd on 6 January 1961.

Citations

References
Books

Journal and news articles

External links

Bathurst-class corvettes of the Royal Australian Navy
Ships built in Queensland
1942 ships
World War II corvettes of Australia
Training ships of the Royal Australian Navy